Kumla HC "Black Bulls", often referred to as Kumla Hockey, is a Kumla, Sweden-based ice hockey club.  Kumla played in Sweden's second-tier league, Allsvenskan, as recently as the 2000–01 season.  After being relegated in 2001, the team has played in Division 1, the third tier of ice hockey in Sweden.

External links
 Official website
 Profile on Eliteprospects.com

Ice hockey teams in Sweden
Ice hockey clubs established in 1963
Ice hockey teams in Örebro County